Pukara (Quechua for fortress, hispanicized spelling Pucara) is a  mountain in the Andes of Peru, about  high, with an archaeological site on top. It is located in the Puno Region, Sandia Province, Patambuco District, southwest of Patambuco. The pre-Inca funerary  site is also known as Trinchera (Spanish for trench). The place was declared a National Cultural Heritage by Resolución Directoral Nacional No. 296/INC-2003 by the National Institute of Culture. It consists of tombs, walls, houses, squares and tunnels.

References 

Mountains of Puno Region
Mountains of Peru
Archaeological sites in Peru